Nemopalpus is a genus of moth fly in the family Psychodidae, in the subfamily Bruchomyiinae. Nemopalpus is sometimes spelled "Nemapalpus" and recently (2018) a number of similar species have been transferred to the genera: Alexanderia, Boreofairchildia, Laurenceomyia and Notofairchildia.

Species
Nemopalpus capensis (Edwards, 1929)
Nemopalpus concolor Stuckenberg, 1962
Nemopalpus davidsoni Stuckenberg, 1978
Nemopalpus flavus Macquart, 1838
Nemopalpus hennigianus Schlüter, 1978
Nemopalpus inexpectatus Wagner, 2012
Nemopalpus ledgeri (Stuckenberg, 1978)
Nemopalpus molophilinus (Edwards, 1921)
Nemopalpus tertiariae (Meunier, 1905)
Nemopalpus transvaalensis Stuckenberg, 1962

References

Further reading

 

Psychodidae
Taxonomy articles created by Polbot
Taxa named by Pierre-Justin-Marie Macquart
Nematocera genera